On 15 April 2008, Hewa Bora Airways Flight 122, a McDonnell Douglas DC-9-51 plane crashed into a residential and market area of Goma of the Democratic Republic of the Congo immediately south of Goma International Airport.

Background
The eastern part of the DRC had been war-torn for decades, as various factions sought control of mineral resources. Goma was a center for the air shipping of cassiterite (tin oxide ore) from Nord-Kivu.

The European Union placed all DRC airlines on its List of airlines banned in the EU.  HBA has held a single exemption for a single Boeing 767-266ER tail number 9Q-CJD, construction number 193H-1209, but that too had been removed on 11 April 2008.  Very similar crashes in the DRC the previous October in the capital, Kinshasa and in 1996 also came down in residential or market areas. Because the DRC has so little passable roadway, most freight is moved by air and markets are common near airstrips.

HBA operated a number of different aircraft types, none of them modern.  This aircraft was 31 years old.

Goma is on the volcanically active Great African Rift Valley. One volcano, Nyiragongo, is so close that its January 2002 eruption destroyed the north end of runway 18/36, leaving just  for aircraft operations. Another report states that only 1600 to 1800 m of the runway was usable. If the lower of these figures were correct, then the corresponding MTOW would be reduced another .

Crash
The aircraft was departing Goma bound for Kisangani. According to the director of the RVA, the number one engine caught fire after . The fire developed into an uncontained engine failure. The aircraft subsequently overran the runway and crashed at 14:30 local time (12:30 UTC), impacting concrete homes, shops and market stalls. The crash site was located at the Birere market on l'Avenue du 20 Mai, just beyond the south end of runway 18.

Casualties
There were 86 passengers and eight crew members aboard the flight. Three of the passengers and 37 people on the ground were killed in the accident. A further 40 passengers and 71 people on the ground were injured.

Greek Orthodox Metropolitan bishop of Central Africa Ignatios was among the survivors of the crash. 
 Another non-Congolese survivor was an Alcatel engineer named Selami Mordeniz. The fourth day more remains were recovered bringing the toll to 44, while 13 were still missing and 60 were rescued. An additional find, coupled with two deaths in hospital, brought the toll to 47 as of 19 April. The Heal Africa clinic treated many of the injured. One of those still missing after 48 hours was an aid worker with the group Médecins Sans Frontières.

Response
The airport had no functioning firefighting equipment.
The initial crash response involved several international agencies present in Goma, including several organisations of the United Nations (MONUC, Office for the Coordination of Humanitarian Affairs, UNICEF, World Health Organization) and also Médecins Sans Frontières France and the International Red Cross. Members of the 6th Battalion of the Sikh Light Infantry, Indian Army, who were posted there as part of the North Kivu Brigade of the UN Mission in Congo (MONUC), swung into action to effect a rescue of 6 survivors and retrieve 18 bodies. Indian Army personnel were also involved in initial crowd control and preventing the fire that arose from spreading to thickly populated areas nearby. Both flight recorders were recovered.

One Kinshasa paper, Le phare, reports that airports throughout the country are still using fifty-year-old infrastructure from the Belgian colonial era.
Two days after the crash, the DRC government committed to making the runway repairs neglected since January 2002. A local human rights organization laid the blame on the DRC government: 

The World Bank released  in 2015 to complete the work.

Investigation
In their 2011 report to Congress, the NTSB classified this accident as a major ongoing investigation in which they were assisting the Democratic Republic of the Congo.

References

External links

 Dozens killed as DC-9 jet crashes in Congo Houston Chronicle
 African air crash kills 75; 15 survive CNN
 Video footage of disaster
 Crash survivor: God 'still has work for us to do'
 Patrick Smith "Ask the pilot" Salon, page 2 2008-04-25 - ad supported site
 
 "UN staff among few survivors of deadly plane crash in eastern DR Congo" UN Daily News 2008-04-15

Accidents and incidents by airline of Africa
Aviation accidents and incidents in 2008
Aviation accidents and incidents in the Democratic Republic of the Congo
2008 in the Democratic Republic of the Congo
Airliner accidents and incidents involving runway overruns
Accidents and incidents involving the McDonnell Douglas DC-9
Goma
April 2008 events in Africa